Catholic sacraments may refer to sacraments in the:
 Albanian Greek Catholic Church 
 Armenian Catholic Church 
 Belarusian Greek Catholic Church 
 Bulgarian Greek Catholic Church 
 Chaldean Catholic Church 
 Coptic Catholic Church 
 Eastern Catholic Churches
 Eritrean Catholic Church 
 Ethiopian Catholic Church 
 Georgian Byzantine-Rite Catholics
 Greek Byzantine Catholic Church 
 Greek Catholic Church of Croatia and Serbia 
 Hungarian Greek Catholic Church
 Independent Catholicism
 Italo-Albanian Catholic Church 
 Latin Church
 Macedonian Greek Catholic Church 
 Melkite Greek Catholic Church 
 Old Catholic Church
 Roman Catholic Church
 Romanian Greek Catholic Church 
 Russian Greek Catholic Church 
 Ruthenian Greek Catholic Church 
 Sacraments of the Catholic Church
 Slovak Greek Catholic Church 
 Syriac Catholic Church 
 Syro-Malankara Catholic Church

See also
 Eastern Catholic Churches
 Eastern Orthodox Church
 Oriental Orthodox Churches